Princess Marie Amelie of Baden (Marie Amelie Elisabeth Caroline; 11 October 1817 – 17 October 1888) was the youngest daughter of Charles, Grand Duke of Baden and Stéphanie de Beauharnais. In 1843, she married the Scottish nobleman William Hamilton, Marquess of Douglas and Clydesdale. They became the Duke and Duchess of Hamilton upon the death of William's father in 1852. Their only daughter Mary married the future Albert I, Prince of Monaco and was the mother of Louis II.

Princess Marie Amelie was a cousin of Napoleon III of France, as well as a friend of his and his wife's, Empress Eugénie. She often accompanied the couple at official events, and provided them lodging when they visited her outside France.

Family and early life
Princess Marie Amelie was born  in Karlsruhe, the youngest daughter of Charles, Grand Duke of Baden, and his wife Stéphanie de Beauharnais, the adopted daughter of Napoleon I of France. Charles's daughters married into several great European ruling families. Marie Amelie's older sister Princess Louise married the Swedish prince Gustav, Prince of Vasa, and her other sister Princess Josephine married Karl Anton, Prince of Hohenzollern. Louise was the mother of Queen Carola of Saxony, while Josephine was the mother of Carol I of Romania and Queen Stephanie of Portugal.

Marriage
On 23 February 1843, she married the Scottish nobleman William Hamilton, Marquess of Douglas and Clydesdale, the only son of the 10th Duke of Hamilton. The couple had two sons and one daughter: William (later 12th Duke of Hamilton), Charles (later 7th Earl of Selkirk and Lieutenant of 11th Hussars), and Lady Mary Victoria (later wed to Albert I, Prince of Monaco in 1869). 

After her wedding, she relocated to Brodick Castle on the Isle of Arran, which was built in her honour in the Bavarian style. She then moved later on Hamilton Palace in Lanarkshire, Scotland. Her husband succeeded as Duke of Hamilton upon the death of her father-in-law in 1852. The Duke at least mainly lived in Baden-Baden and Paris after his marriage.

Duchess of Hamilton
The Duchess was a cousin and friend of Napoleon III of France. She and her husband accompanied Napoleon during his official state entry into Paris in 1852, and she was present in 1860 when he visited her in Baden, at a popular summer resort for Paris's upper classes. She also accompanied the Emperor at an 1855 celebration in honor of King Victor Emmanuel II of Sardinia and the 1856 baptism of Napoléon, Prince Imperial. Napoleon's wife, Empress Eugénie, was also reported as being a friend of Marie, and the Empress would often stay with Marie when she visited Baden and Scotland. Eugénie angered many when she insisted that Princess Marie take precedence and be seated with the Imperial Family. In 1860, an exhausted Eugénie wished to leave France but found that her destinations on the continent were limited due to political concerns; Princess Marie, sympathetic to her plight, successfully offered Eugénie a stay at her husband's home in Scotland. 

In 1853, the Glasgow Free Press reported that the Duchess had converted to Roman Catholicism. Stéphanie de Beauharnais died seven years later. Queen Sophie of the Netherlands, a friend of Stéphanie's, later claimed that Marie Amelie "behaved ill to her" mother, blaming this on her "Catholic bigotry". Sophie was particularly upset that the Duchess of Hamilton failed to see her mother on her deathbed, though her husband did make the visit. Five years later, in an 1867 letter, Queen Sophie described Marie Amelie as "bloodless, fat, sick," and complained that her sons were "restless and bad," while her daughter was "far from handsome."

Princess Marie gave £20 to establish a Catholic school in Hamilton, opened on 17 January 1853. The funds were used to purchase classroom items and pay the teacher's salary. Afterwards she made an annual donation of £20 for the upkeep of the school. She also donated items for St Mary's Church for the celebration of Mass and gave money for a set of stations of the cross, a new altar and two side altars. The Duchess often attended services in St Mary's.

In 1863, the Duke collapsed while dining at the Maison dorée, Boulevard des Italiens in Paris. Once his party realised his condition was serious, he was brought back to Hôtel Bristol in Place Vendôme. Marie Amelie arrived at his side, and while he seemed to be recovering, he died suddenly three days later, on 15 July 1863. He was fifty-two years old. His wealth at death was estimated at under £140,000. She was styled Marie Amelie, Princess of Baden, Dowager Duchess of Hamilton after her husband's death.

Princess Marie occupied the Villa Stephanie in Baden-Baden, where her daughter used to visit her annually. In 1904, the contemporary journal Lady's Realm reported that the place was the "rendezvous of the very best cosmopolitan society." She was a friend of Albert Edward, Prince of Wales. As of 1867, she and her son were being associated with a disreputable company, the type that his mother Queen Victoria urged him to avoid. Marie also paid and received visits to members of the British Royal Family, including the Duchess of Kent and Queen Victoria.  She died in Baden-Baden, aged 71.

In 1869, her only daughter Lady Mary Victoria Hamilton married Prince Albert (later Albert I), son and heir of Charles III, Prince of Monaco. The union was unhappy, however, and Mary left Monaco and her husband after giving birth to an heir, Louis II. The marriage was annulled in 1880. She later married the Hungarian magnate Prince Tasziló Festetics, living from that point onwards mainly in her husband's native country. Through Mary, Marie is the great-great-grandmother of the current reigning prince of Monaco, Albert II.

Issue
The Duke and Duchess of Hamilton had two sons and one daughter

 William Douglas-Hamilton, 12th Duke of Hamilton ( 12 March 1845 – 16 May 1895) he married Lady Mary Montagu on 10 December 1873 and had issue.
 Charles Douglas-Hamilton, 7th Earl of Selkirk (18 May 1847 – 2 May 1886)
Lady Mary Victoria Hamilton (11 December 1850 – 14 May 1922) she married Albert I, Prince of Monaco on 21 September 1869 but divorced on 28 July 1880. They had issue. She remarried Tassilo, Prince Festetics de Tolna on 2 June 1880. They had issue.

Ancestry

References

Works cited

 
 
 
 
 
 
 
 
 
 
 
 

1817 births
1888 deaths
Hamilton
People from Mannheim
House of Zähringen
Princesses of Baden
House of Douglas and Angus
Daughters of monarchs